Pierre Jourdan (23 June 1923 – 21 October 2020) was a French politician.

He was a Senator (1971–1980) and the mayor of Saint-Étienne-de-Lugdarès (1959–1980).

References

1923 births
2020 deaths
Politicians from Montpellier